Yozyovon is an urban-type settlement in Fergana Region, Uzbekistan. It is the capital of Yozyovon District. Its population was 7,458 people in 1989, and 12,800 in 2016.

References

Populated places in Fergana Region
Urban-type settlements in Uzbekistan